Sir Antony Mark David Gormley  (born 30 August 1950) is a British sculptor. His works include the Angel of the North, a public sculpture in Gateshead in the north of England, commissioned in 1994 and erected in February 1998; Another Place on Crosby Beach near Liverpool; and Event Horizon, a multipart site installation which premiered in London in 2007, then subsequently in Madison Square in New York City (2010), São Paulo, Brazil (2012), and Hong Kong (2015–16).

Early life
Gormley was born in London, the youngest of seven children, to a German mother and a father of Irish descent. His paternal grandfather was an Irish Catholic from Derry who settled in Walsall in Staffordshire. The ancestral homeland of the Gormley Clan (Irish: Ó Goirmleadhaigh) in Ulster was East Donegal and West Tyrone, with most people in both Derry and Strabane being of County Donegal origin. Gormley has stated that his parents chose his initials, "AMDG", to have the inference  – "to the greater glory of God".

Gormley grew up in a Roman Catholic family living in Hampstead Garden Suburb. He attended Ampleforth College, a Benedictine boarding school in Yorkshire, before reading archaeology, anthropology, and the history of art at Trinity College, Cambridge, from 1968 to 1971. He travelled to India and the Dominion of Ceylon / Sri Lanka to learn more about Buddhism between 1971 and 1974.

After attending Saint Martin's School of Art and Goldsmiths in London from 1974, he completed his studies with a postgraduate course in sculpture at the Slade School of Fine Art, between 1977 and 1979.

Personal life 
While at the Slade, Gormley met Vicken Parsons, who was to become his assistant, and in 1980, his wife, as well as a successful artist in her own right. Gormley said of her:

The couple have a daughter and two sons.

In June 2022 Gormley said that he had applied for German citizenship, to which he is entitled through his German mother, after describing Brexit as "a practical disaster" and a "betrayal". He expected to receive his new passport within the next month.

Career

Gormley's career began with a solo exhibition at the Whitechapel Art Gallery in 1981. Almost all his work takes the human body as its subject, with his own body used in many works as the basis for metal castings.

Gormley describes his work as "an attempt to materialise the place at the other side of appearance where we all live." Many of his works are based on moulds taken from his own body, or "the closest experience of matter that I will ever have and the only part of the material world that I live inside." His work attempts to treat the body not as an object, but as a place and in making works that enclose the space of a particular body to identify a condition common to all human beings. The work is not symbolic but indexical – a trace of a real event of a real body in time.

The 2006 Sydney Biennale featured Gormley's Asian Field, an installation of 180,000 small clay figurines crafted by 350 Chinese villagers in five days from 100 tons of red clay. Use of others' works attracted minor comment. Some figurines were stolen. Also in 2006, the burning of Gormley's 25-m high The Waste Man formed the zenith of the Margate Exodus.

In 2007, Gormley's Event Horizon, consisting of 31 life-sized and anatomically correct casts of his body, four in cast iron and 27 in fiberglass, was installed on top of prominent buildings along London's South Bank, and installed in locations around New York City's Madison Square in 2010.  Gormley said of the New York site, "Within the condensed environment of Manhattan's topography, the level of tension between the palpable, the perceivable, and the imaginable is heightened because of the density and scale of the buildings" and that in this context, the project should "activate the skyline in order to encourage people to look around.  In this process of looking and finding, or looking and seeking, one perhaps re-assess one's own position in the world and becomes aware of one's status of embedment." Critic Howard Halle said that "Using distance and attendant shifts of scale within the very fabric of the city, [Event Horizon] creates a metaphor for urban life and all the contradictory associations – alienation, ambition, anonymity, fame – it entails."

In July 2009, Gormley presented One & Other, a Fourth Plinth commission, an invitation for members of the public, chosen by lot, to spend one hour on the vacant plinth in Trafalgar Square in London. This "living art" happening initially attracted much media attention. It even became a topic of discussion on the long-running BBC radio drama series The Archers, where Gormley made an appearance as himself.

In 2012, Gormley began making sculptures that could be termed as "digital-cubism". Through solid steel cubes, the human form is rendered into an array of different postures and poses, boldly standing in a white gallery space.

In March 2014, Gormley appeared in the BBC Four series What Do Artists Do All Day? in an episode that followed his team and him in their Kings Cross studio, preparing a new work – a group of 60 enormous steel figures – called Expansion Field. The work was shown at the Zentrum Paul Klee in Bern.

In May 2015 five life-sized sculptures, Land, were placed near the centre and at four compass points of the UK in a commission by the Landmark Trust to celebrate its 50th anniversary. They are at Lowsonford (Warwickshire), Lundy (Bristol Channel), Saddell Bay (Scotland), the Martello Tower (Aldeburgh, Suffolk), and Clavell Tower (Kimmeridge Bay, Dorset). The Dorset sculpture was knocked over into Kimmeridge Bay by a storm in September 2015.

On 6 September 2015, Another Place had its 10th anniversary at Crosby Beach in Liverpool. Talking of their 10th birthday:I'm just delighted by the barnacles!Every time I'm there, just like any other visitor, you're encouraged to linger a bit longer seeing the tide come in and how many of them disappear. And then you're encouraged to linger further until they're revealed again.In September 2015, Gormley had his first sculpture installed in New Zealand. Stay is a group of identical cast-iron human form sculptures, with the first installed in the Avon River in Christchurch's central city, and the other sculpture to be installed in the nearby Arts Centre in early 2016.

Gormley is a patron of Paintings in Hospitals, a charity that provides art for health and social care in England, Wales, and Northern Ireland.

In 2017, Gormley curated Inside, an exhibition at the Southbank Centre, London, presented by Koestler Trust showing artworks by prisoners, detainees, and ex-offenders. In addition, he judged their annual category prize, also on the theme "inside".

On 21 April 2018, Gormley released a limited edition vinyl album of ambient sounds from his studio for Record Store Day titled Sounds of the Studio. It consisted of two tracks (one on each side) titled Sounds of the Studio (Part 1) and Sounds of the Studio (Part 2). It came with an inner with a monochrome print of his studio on one side and text by the artist with a photo on the other.

In 2019, Gormley repopulated the island of Delos with iron "bodyforms" with the unprecedented site-specific exhibition Sight. Organised and commissioned by the NEON Organization and presented in collaboration with the Ephorate of Antiquities of Cyclades, this project marked the first time that an artist took over the archaeological site of Delos since the island was inhabited over 5,000 years ago, and is the first time a contemporary art installation has been unanimously approved by the Greek Archaeological Council of the Ministry of Culture to take place in Delos, a UNESCO World Heritage Site. Talking about this exhibition, Antony Gormley stated, "I treat the body as a place encouraging empathic occupation of that which lies the other side of appearance: what it feels like". He installed 29 sculptures made during the last 20 years, including five new works specially commissioned by the NEON Organization, both at the periphery and integrated amongst Delos's archaeological site and museum animating the geological and archaeological features of the island.

In 2020, Gormley was confirmed to be "lending" a sculpture to Kirklees College to sit atop its new building at Pioneer House in the town of his birth, Dewsbury, as part of a major redevelopment in the town.

Virtual reality
In 2017, the Royal Academy invited Gormley to consider the possibilities of virtual reality (VR). In 2019 in collaboration with astronomer Priyamvada Natarajan he produced a VR experience called Lunatick, which allows the viewer to seemingly travel through space to the Moon and fly over its surface, based on images from NASA's Lunar Reconnaissance Orbiter.

Recognition
Gormley won the Turner Prize in 1994 with Field for the British Isles. He was quoted as saying that he was "embarrassed and guilty to have won...In the moment of winning there is a sense the others have been diminished. I know artists who've been seriously knocked off their perches through disappointment."

Gormley has been a Royal Academician since 2003, and was a trustee of the British Museum from 2007 to 2015. He is an honorary fellow of the Royal Society of Arts and the Royal Institute of British Architects, honorary doctor of the universities of Teesside, Liverpool, University College London, and Cambridge, and a fellow of Trinity and Jesus Colleges, Cambridge.  In October 2010, 100 other leading artists and he signed an open letter to Culture Minister Jeremy Hunt protesting cutbacks in the arts.

On 13 March 2011, Gormley was awarded the Laurence Olivier Award for Outstanding Achievement in Dance for the set design for Babel (Words) at Sadler's Wells in collaboration with Sidi Larbi Cherkaoui and Damien Jalet. He was the recipient of the Obayashi Prize in 2012 and is the 2013 Praemium Imperiale laureate for sculpture. Gormley was knighted in the 2014 New Year Honours for services to the arts, having previously been appointed OBE in 1998.

For Room, he received the 2015 Marsh Award for Excellence in Public Sculpture.

In 2019, the Royal Academy held an exhibition filling its 13 main galleries with Gormley's works, including some new (designed to fit the space), some remade for the gallery, and some of his early sculptures, with two rooms of his drawings and sketchbooks.

In 2008, The Daily Telegraph ranked Gormley number four in their list of the "100 most powerful people in British culture".

Art market
Gormley's auction record is £3,401,250 for a maquette of the Angel of the North, set at Christie's, London, on 14 October 2011.

Major works

Gormley's website includes images of nearly all of his works up to 2012. The most notable include:

 Bed (1981) – purchased by the Tate Gallery.
 Sound II (1986) – in the crypt of Winchester Cathedral, Winchester, Hampshire, England

 Field (1991; and subsequent recreations)
 Iron:Man (1993) –  Victoria Square, Birmingham, England
 Havmann (1995) –  Mo i Rana, Norway
 Another Place (1997) – permanently installed at Crosby Beach near Liverpool, England
 Quantum Cloud (1999)– Greenwich, London, England
 Broken Column (1999–2003) – Stavanger, Norway
 Angel of the North (1998) – Low Fell (overlooking the A1 and A167 roads), Gateshead, Tyne and Wear, England
 Present Time (2001) – at Mansfield College, Oxford
 Planets (2002) – at the British Library, London.
 Filter (2002) – acquired by Manchester Art Gallery, Manchester, England, in 2009
 Inside Australia (2003) permanent exhibition at Lake Ballard, Western Australia
 Time Horizon – the Archaeological Park of Scolacium near Catanzaro in Calabria, Southern Italy
 Ferment (2007)
 Blind Light (2007), Hayward Gallery, South Bank, London
 Event Horizon (2007) – along the South Bank of the Thames, London, England; (2010) around Madison Square, New York City; 2012 in São Paulo, Brazil; 2015–16 in Hong Kong
 Reflection II (2008) – acquired by DeCordova Museum and Sculpture Park, Lincoln, Massachusetts, in 2009
 One & Other (6 July – 14 October 2009) – Trafalgar Square, London, England
 Habitat – Gormley's first permanent installation in the United States, in Anchorage, Alaska on the grounds of the Anchorage Museum, cost an estimated $565,000.
 Another Time XI (2009) – Gormley's sculpture on top of Exeter College, Oxford, overlooking Broad Street
 Horizon Field (2010–2012) – sculpture installation in the Austrian Alps.
 Exposure (2010) – Lelystad, Netherlands
 Cloud Chain (2010) – Les Archives Nationales, Paris, France
 Transport (2011) - Crypt of Canterbury Cathedral, Kent, England
 Mothership with Standing Matter (2011) Lillehammer, Norway
 Witness (2011) – on the piazza of the British Library, London; commissioned by English PEN to mark their 90th anniversary.
 Horizon Field Hamburg (2012) – Deichtorhallen, Germany
 Stay (2015/16) – Christchurch, New Zealand
Sight (2019) – Delos Island, Mykonos, Greece; organised and commissioned by the NEON Organization and presented in collaboration with the Ephorate of Antiquities of Cyclades of the Greek Ministry of Culture and Sports.

See also
What Do Artists Do All Day?

References

External links

 Official website
 
 Antony Gormley on Artcyclopedia

 Gormley's exhibition in Guernsey for the International Artist In Residence Programme IAIRP
 Pictures of Gormley's sculpture in Oxford being erected on 15 February 2009
 Interviewed by Alan Macfarlane 29 April 2009 (video)
 An interview with Gormley by Edward Lucie Smith in RealMedia format
 Interactive video interview with Gormley and interactive exploration of his work at the Tate Gallery 
 Antony Gormley audio: The artist considers his art and his research into the Wellcome collections
 Antony Gormley at Xavier hufkens, Brussels
 Tate: In the Studio: Antony Gormley. A tour of the artist's studio. 1 September 2007
 Studio Visit: Antony Gormley. London, 4 November 2011
 Gormley's artwork Mothership with Standing Matter in Lillehammer, Norway
 White Cube
 Antony Gormley. A tour around his studio Video by Louisiana Channel
 
 Profile on Royal Academy of Arts Collections
Antony Gormley on the sacred island of Delos talking about SIGHT exhibition

 
20th-century British sculptors
21st-century sculptors
English sculptors
English male sculptors
Alumni of Goldsmiths, University of London
Alumni of Saint Martin's School of Art
Alumni of the Slade School of Fine Art
Alumni of Trinity College, Cambridge
People educated at Ampleforth College
Recipients of the Praemium Imperiale
Royal Academicians
Trustees of the British Museum
Turner Prize winners
Officers of the Order of the British Empire
Knights Bachelor
English contemporary artists
1950 births
Living people